Robert and Bertram is a 1961 West German comedy film directed by Hans Deppe and starring Willy Millowitsch, Vico Torriani and Trude Herr. It was inspired by the characters in Gustav Raeder's 1856 play Robert and Bertram, update to the modern era. Two vagabonds, Robert and Bertram, are hired by a shoe company to walk 500 kilometres to test their new product.

It was shot at the Spandau Studios in Berlin and on location in the Bavarian town of Eichstätt. The film's sets were designed by the art directors Paul Markwitz and Wilhelm Vorwerg.

Cast
Willy Millowitsch as Robert Ziegel
Vico Torriani as Bertram Weiler
Trude Herr as Klara Ziegel
Marlies Behrens as Yvonne Berger
Helen Vita as Mieze Frühling
Erwin Strahl as Franco
Hubert von Meyerinck as Detective Commissioner Wolf
Ralf Wolter as Toni Knauer
Margarete Haagen as old lady in the car
Arno Paulsen as Direktor Malina
Kurt Pratsch-Kaufmann as policeman
Erich Fiedler as Dr. Abendroth
Kurt Waitzmann as Dr. Sommerfeld
Johanna König as Fräulein Sellner
Franz Schneider as Kegelbruder Franz
Josef Tilgen as Kegelbruder Hans
Egon Vogel as Kegelbruder Willi
Lotti Krekel as Dagmar, hitchhiker
Anja Brüning as Gisela, hitchhiker

References

External links

West German films
1961 comedy films
German comedy films
Films directed by Hans Deppe
German films based on plays
Remakes of German films
Films shot at Spandau Studios
1960s German-language films
1960s German films